Maurice O'Connell may refer to:
 Maurice O'Connell (MP) (c.1801–1853), Irish politician, Member of Parliament (MP) for Tralee 1832–1837 and 1838–1853, son of Daniel O'Connell
 Maurice O'Connell (Fine Gael politician) (born 1936), Irish Fine Gael senator
Maurice O'Connell (banker) (died 2019), governor of the Central Bank of Ireland
 Maurice Charles O'Connell (Australian politician) (1812–1879)
 Maurice Charles O'Connell (1768–1848), commander of forces and lieutenant-governor of New South Wales
 Maurice D. O'Connell (1839–1922), Iowa attorney
 Maurice O'Connell (actor) (born 1941) in The Satanic Rites of Dracula